Voxeet is VoIP web conferencing software that uses 3D high definition voice technology to produce immersive sound. It is available for Windows, iPhone and Android. 
In 2012, it won the DemoGod Award at DEMO Spring '12.

Technology
In a real-life conversation, sounds follow a complex journey before reaching the listener's ears. The listeners's brains then analyse the sounds and their alterations to determine the source's position in the room. This enables them to identify the speaker even without seeing them or recognizing their voice. In a crowded, noisy room, the brain can isolate specific sounds and focus on decoding relevant information while disregarding other sounds, a phenomenon also called the cocktail party effect.

Traditional conferencing software uses one microphone that mixes all sounds, losing this location information and making it impossible for the brain to use spatial information to filter what it is hearing. This increases fatigue by requiring listeners to distinguish who is speaking, as well as what they are saying.

Voxeet uses multiple microphones to reproduce natural location mechanisms, creating a virtual 3D audio space that makes listening easier and less taxing.

Features
Voxeet allows up to 8 participants to have online conferences with high definition voice and 3D sound on Windows computers, and iPhone and Android phones. Participants use headsets to experience immersion. The system provides:

VoiP HD 3D Sound
Visual Cues to know who is speaking
Mobile phone integration with one-click transfer

References

VoIP software
Teleconferencing
Web conferencing
Software companies based in California
VoIP services
VoIP companies of the United States
Companies based in Marin County, California
Windows multimedia software
Defunct software companies of the United States